Bohemond of Saarbrücken (died 10 February 1367) was the Archbishop of Trier (as Bohemond II) and a Prince Elector of the Holy Roman Empire from 2 May 1354 to 4 April 1362.

Of the Alsatian house of Ettendorf, Bohemond was elected unanimously to succeed Baldwin, Archbishop of Trier, on the latter's death in 1354. He was confirmed by Pope Innocent VI on 2 May. He was of an advanced age and devoted to governing his diocese in peace. Governing in the wake of Baldwin seemed to favour him in this. He made treaties with Gerlach of Mainz, William of Cologne, and the Elector Palatine Rupert I.

He began the construction of Burg Maus in 1356.

Feudal infighting weakened him considerably, however, and, on 4 April, he resigned his see in favour of his coadjutor Kuno of Falkenstein, with papal permission. He died at Saarburg and was buried in Trier Cathedral. He was loved by the people and affectionately called "White Smocks" for the white overcoat he often wore.

Sources
Gesta Trevirorum

1367 deaths

Year of birth unknown

14th-century Roman Catholic archbishops in the Holy Roman Empire

Bohemond 02